Puertecillo is a beach located inside the Topocalma Fundo in Navidad, Cardenal Caro Province, Chile.
It was discovered by surfers in the late 1980s. On the south end of the beach there is a long sand bottom left point break.  Over the last 20 years, several surfers have built a surfing-oriented community.  The main gathering spot is the "Para de Gozar",  where a culture of taking care of the beach is the main focus.

Since developers built a road through the forest and ran electrical lines several years ago there are few houses now and a handful of residents, less than 100, and a few tourists, most surfers.  There are about 3 restaurants, 1 small store, a couple of real estate offices, and some houses.  Still the beaches are for the most part empty. There is a real estate development there too, which this publication calls a threat, but there's not a lot of flat ground to build and what has been built so far is small.

References

Beaches of Chile
Populated places in Cardenal Caro Province
Landforms of O'Higgins Region
Coasts of O'Higgins Region